Michael Lilander (born 20 June 1997) is an Estonian professional footballer who plays as a right back for Estonian Meistriliiga club Flora and the Estonia national team.

International career
Lilander made his senior international debut for Estonia on 23 November 2017, in a 1–0 away win over Vanuatu in a friendly.

Honours

Club
Flora
Meistriliiga: 2019

References

External links

1997 births
Living people
Footballers from Tallinn
Estonian footballers
Association football defenders
Meistriliiga players
Paide Linnameeskond players
FC Flora players
Estonia youth international footballers
Estonia under-21 international footballers
Estonia international footballers
FC Nõmme United players